The year 1726 in science and technology involved some significant events.

Botany
 October 27 – Caleb Threlkeld publishes Synopsis Stirpium Hibernicarum .....Dispositarum sive Commentatio de Plantis Indigenis praesertim Dublinensibus instituta in Dublin, the first flora of Ireland.

Medicine
 A faculty of medicine is formally established at the University of Edinburgh in Scotland, a predecessor of the University of Edinburgh Medical School. John Rutherford becomes Professor of Practice of Medicine.

Technology
 For clocks, the gridiron pendulum is developed by John Harrison, as a pendulum that compensates for temperature errors: a grid of alternating brass and steel rods is arranged so that the expansion due to heat is dissipated.

Publications
 Johann Beringer publishes Lithographiæ Wirceburgensis describing hoax fossils.

Births
 February 6 – Patrick Russell, Scottish-born surgeon and herpetologist (died 1805)
 June 3 – James Hutton, Scottish geologist (died 1797)
 Thomas Melvill, Scottish natural philosopher (died 1753)
 date unknown - Lady Anne Monson, English botanist (died 1776)

Deaths
 January 25 – Guillaume Delisle, French scientist, one of the founders of modern geography (born 1675)

References

 
18th century in science
1720s in science